Laxå is a locality and the seat of Laxå Municipality in Örebro County, Sweden with 3,064 inhabitants in 2010.

History
The town was founded in the mid-19th century when the main line railway between Gothenburg and Stockholm (Västra Stambanan) was built in 1883. Laxå is exactly  from both those cities.

In the vicinity of the town Laxå lies the Porla Well. Its iron rich water made it a popular spa between 1724 until 1939. Although not a spa, its water is sold in bottles with the brand "Porlavatten" and have been distributed nationwide since the 1920s.

On August 17, 2012, it was reported in Dagens Nyheter that Laxå is Sweden's poorest municipality and the only one in the country with a net debt.

References

External links

Official website of Laxå municipality

Populated places in Örebro County
Populated places in Laxå Municipality
Municipal seats of Örebro County
Swedish municipal seats